You Me and Captain Longbridge (2008) is a 15 minutes short film directed by Kenny Doughty and written & produced by Caroline Carver. The film stars Callum Williams as the 11-year-old Luke, Chris Larkin as Captain Longbridge and Joseph Fiennes as the voice of Luke as an adult. The short film played in 12 International Film Festivals and won 3 awards.

Synopsis 
You Me and Captain Longbridge captures a journey into the soul of 11-year-old Luke Stanton.
Isolated by the abrupt death of his father, Luke struggles to come to terms with his inner feelings of hurt and loss. It is only when his imagination begins to take over that Luke begins to find an outlet for his raw emotion set against a majestic world of fantasy.

Festivals and awards 
 Winner Gold Remi Award for Best Short – 41st WorldFest-Houston International Film Festival 2008
 Winner Glimmer Award for Best Short – Glimmer Hull International Film Festival –  2008
 Winner Best International Short – The Vine Short Film Festival, Los Angeles, USA 2008
 Official Selection – Los Angeles International Short Film Festival 2008
 Official Selection – Sapporo Short Film Festival, Japan 2008
 Official Selection – LUCAS International Children’s Film Festival, Frankfurt, Germany 2008
 Official Selection – Los Angeles International Children's Film Festival  2008
 Official Selection – Cinemagic World Screen Festival For Young People, Belfast, N. Ireland 2008
 Official Selection – 24fps International Film Festival, Texas, USA 2008
 Official Selection – Leeds International Film Festival 2008
 Official Selection – European Youth Film Festival of Flanders, Antwerp, Belgium 2009
 Official Selection – RiverRun International Film Festival, Winston-Salem, North Carolina, USA 2009

Technical 
UK:15 min
Country:UK
Language:English
Format: 35 mm Film
Colour:Colour
Aspect Ratio: 2.35 : 1
Sound: Dolby Stereo
It was shot in and around the location of Barnsley's countryside, Kenny Doughty's birthplace.

References 

 http://www.filmfestivalworld.com/film/You_Me_and_Captain_Longbridge/
 http://www.jeugdfilmfestival.be/en/films/695
 http://shootingpeople.org/watch/film.php?film_id=87688

External links 
 https://www.imdb.com/title/tt1168666/

British short films